Ibrahimpur is a village in the southern state of Karnataka, India. It is located in the Navalgund taluk of Dharwad district.

Demographics 
As of the 2011 Census of India there were 692 households in Ibrahimpur and a total population of 3,767 consisting of 1,935 males and 1,832 females. There were 524 children ages 0-6.

References

Villages in Dharwad district